Wallace T. Johnson (1915 – January 27, 2007) was an American football and wrestling coach.

Playing career
Johnson played football for one year in 1937 at the University of Minnesota before a broken leg ended his career. He instead turned to wrestling where he excelled.

Coaching career
Johnson served as a wrestling coach at South Dakota State in Brookings, South Dakota, before starting the wrestling program at Luther College in Decorah, Iowa where he was also the head football coach.

Johnson left Luther in 1952 to become the head wrestling coach at the University of Minnesota, where he would serve until his retirement in 1986. He was also an assistant football coach for the first 20 years he coach at U of M.

Head coaching record

Football

References

1915 births
2007 deaths
Luther Norse football coaches
Minnesota Golden Gophers football coaches
Minnesota Golden Gophers football players
Minnesota Golden Gophers wrestlers
Minnesota Golden Gophers wrestling coaches
People from Detroit Lakes, Minnesota